Arroyo Burro or Arroyo Burro Creek is a stream in Santa Barbara County, California.

References 

Rivers of Santa Barbara County, California
Rivers of Southern California